

A–P 

To find entries for A–P, use the table of contents above.

Q 

 Q.D.Clarkson – Quentin Deane Clarkson (born 1925)
 Q.E.Yang – Qin Er Yang (born 1964)
 Q.F.Wang –  Guang Wan Hu (fl. 2007)
 Quehl – Leopold Quehl (1849–1922)
 Quél. – Lucien Quélet (1832–1899)
 Quinn – Christopher John Quinn (born 1936)
 Quiñones – Luz Mila Quiñones (fl. 1995)
 Quinq. –  E. Quinquaud (fl. 1868)
 Quisumb. – Eduardo Quisumbíng y Argüelles (1895–1986)
 Quoy – Jean René Constant Quoy (1790–1869)
 Q.Wang – Qi Wang (fl. 1989)
 Q.W.Meng – Qian Wan Meng (fl. 2008)
 Q.W.Zeng – Qing Wen Zeng (1963–2012)
 Q.Xu – Qing Xu (botanist) (fl. 2014)

R 

 Raab-Straube – Eckhard von Raab-Straube (fl. 2003)
 Rabeh. – David Rabehevitra (fl. 2006)
 R.A.Black – Raleigh Adelbert Black (1880–1963)
 Rach – Louis Theodor Rach (1821–1859)
 R.A.Clement – Rose A. Clement (c. 1953–1996)
 Radcl.-Sm. – Alan Radcliffe-Smith (1938–2007)
 Raddi – Giuseppe Raddi (1770–1829)
 Raderm. – Jacob Cornelis Matthieu Radermacher (1741–1783)
 Radford – Albert Ernest Radford (1918–2006)
 Radius – Justus Wilhelm Martin Radius (1797–1884)
 Radlk. – Ludwig Adolph Timotheus Radlkofer (1829–1927)
 R.A.Dyer – Robert Allen Dyer (1900–1987)
 Raeusch. – Ernst Adolf Raeuschel (fl. 1772–1797)
 Raf. – Constantine Samuel Rafinesque (1783–1840)
 Raffles – Thomas Stamford Bingley Raffles (1781–1826)
 Rafn – Carl Gottlob Rafn (1769–1808)
 R.A.Foster – Robert A. Foster (1938–2002)
 R.A.Harper – Robert Almer Harper (1862–1946)
 Rahn – Knud Rahn (1928–2013)
 R.A.Howard – Richard Alden Howard (1917–2003)
 Rajakumar – T.J.S. Rajakumar (fl. 2009)
 Raim. – Rudolph Raimann (1863–1896)
 R.A.Kerrigan – Raelee A. Kerrigan (fl. 2012)
 Ralfs – John Ralfs (1807–1890)
 Ralph Hoffm. – Ralph Hoffmann (1870–1932)
 R.A.Meissn. – Rachel A. Meissner (fl. 2007)
 Ram.Goyena – Miguel Ramírez Goyena (1857–1927)
 Ramond – Louis Ramond de Carbonnières (1755–1827)
 Rand – Isaac Rand (1674–1743)
 Randall – Roderick Peter Randall (born 1960)
 Randell – Barbara Rae Randell (born 1942)
 Randle – Christopher P. Randle (fl. 2006)
 Randolph – Lowell Fitz Randolph (1894–1980)
 Randrian. – Armand Randrianasolo (fl. 1994)
 Rands – Robert Delafield Rands (1890–1970)
 Raoul – Etienne Fiacre Louis Raoul (1815–1852)
 Rapaics – Raymund Rapaics von Rumwerth (or Ruhmwerth) (1885–1953) (forename also as Rajmond, Rajmund, or Raumund)
 Rapin – Daniel Rapin (1799–1882)
 Rasm. – Rasmus Rasmussen (1871–1962)
 Raspail – François Vincent Raspail (1794–1878)
 Rassulova – M.R. Rassulova (1926–2006)
 Rataj – Karel Rataj (1925–2014)
 Rathbone – Damien A. Rathbone (born 1980)
 Rathvon – Simon Snyder Rathvon (1812–1891)
 Rattan – Volney Rattan (1840–1915)
 Ratzeb. – Julius Theodor Christian Ratzeburg (1801–1871)
 Rau – Ananda R. Rao (born 1924)
 Rauh – Werner Rauh (1913–2000)
 Raunk. – Christen C. Raunkiær (1860–1938)
 Raup – Hugh Miller Raup (1901–1995)
 Rauschert – Stephan Rauschert (1931–1986)
 Rauwolff – Leonhard (Leonhart) Rauwolf(f) (1535–1596)
 Raven – John Earle Raven (1914–1980)
 Ravenna – Pierfelice Ravenna (born 1938)
 Rawé – Rolf Rawé (born 1938)
 R.A.W.Herrm. – Rudolf Albert Wolfgang Herrmann (born 1885)
 R.A.White – Richard Alan White (born 1935)
 Rawitscher – Felix Rawitscher (1890–1957)
 Rawson – Rawson W. Rawson (1812–1899)
 Ray – John Ray (1627–1705)
 Raym.-Hamet – Raymond-Hamet, also Raymond Hamet (1890–1972)
 Raymond – Louis-Florent-Marcel Raymond (1915–1972)
 Raynaud – Christian Raynaud (1939–1993)
 Rayner – John Frederick Rayner (1854–1947)
 Rayss – Tscharna Rayss (1890–1965)
 Razaf. – Alfred Razafindratsira (fl. 1987)
 Razafim. – Sylvain G. Razafimandimbison (fl. 1999)
 R.Baron – Richard Baron (1847–1907)
 R.B.Clark – Robert Brown Clark (born 1914)
 R.Bernal – Rodrigo Bernal (born 1959)
 R.Bustam. – Rene Alfred Anton Bustamante (born 1979)
 R.B.Pike – Radcliffe Barnes Pike (1903–1979)
 R.Br. – Robert Brown (1773–1858)
 R.Braga – Ruby Braga (fl. 1964)
 R.Br.bis – Robert Brown (1820–1906)
 R.Br.ter – Robert Brown (1842–1895)
 R.B.Singer – Rodrigo Bustos Singer (born 1970)
 R.Butcher – Ryonen Butcher (born 1972)
 R.B.Wallis – Robert B. Wallis (fl. 2002)
 R.Carbajal – Rodrigo Carbajal (fl. 2017)
 R.C.Clark – Ross C. Clark (born 1940)
 R.C.Foster – Robert Crichton Foster (1904–1986)
 R.C.Gaur – R.C. Gaur (born 1933)
 R.Chan – Raymund Chan (born 1965)
 Rchb. – Heinrich Gottlieb Ludwig Reichenbach (1793–1879)
 Rchb.f. – Heinrich Gustav Reichenbach (1824–1889)
 R.C.Jacks. – Raymond Carl Jackson (1928–2008)
 R.Clark – Ruth Clark (born 1975)
 R.C.Moran – Robbin C. Moran (fl. 1986)
 R.C.Nash – R.C.Nash (fl. 1976)
 R.C.Palmer – Richard Charles Palmer (1935–2005)
 R.C.Schneid. – Richard Conrad Schneider (born 1890)
 R.C.Sinclair – Robert C. Sinclair (fl. 1979)
 R.Cunn. – Richard Cunningham (1793–1835)
 R.Dahlgren – Rolf Martin Theodor Dahlgren (1932–1987)
 R.D.Edwards – Robert David Edwards (born 1981)
 R.D.Good – Ronald D'Oyley Good (1896–1992)
 R.Doll – Reinhard Doll (born 1941)
 R.D.Spencer – Roger David Spencer (born 1945)
 R.D.Thomas – Roy Dale Thomas (born 1936)
 Reader – Felix Reader (1850–1911)
 Reboul – Eugène de Reboul (1781–1851)
 R.E.Brooks – Ralph Edward Brooks (born 1950)
 R.E.Buchanan — Robert Earle Buchanan (1883–1973)
 Rebut – Pierre Rebut (1827–1902) 
 Rech. – Karl Rechinger (1867–1952)
 Rech.f. – Karl Heinz Rechinger (1906–1998)
 R.E.Clausen – Roy Elwood Clausen (1891–1956)
 R.E.Cleland – Ralph Erskine Cleland (1892–1971)
 R.E.Cook – Rachel E. Cook (fl. 2004)
 Record – Samuel James Record (1881–1945)
 R.E.Daniels – Roger Edward Daniels (born 1943)
 R.E.D.Baker – Richard Eric Defoe Baker (1908–1954)
 Redf. – Paul Leslie Redfearn (1926–2018)
 Redfield – John Howard Redfield (1815–1895) 
 Redouté – Pierre-Joseph Redouté (1759–1840)
 Reeder – John Raymond Reeder (1914–2009)
 Rees – Abraham Rees (1743–1825)
 R.E.Fr. – Robert Elias Fries (1876–1966)
 Regel – Eduard August von Regel (1815–1892)
 Rehder – Alfred Rehder (1863–1949)
 Rehmann – Anton Rehmann (1840–1917)
 Reichard – Johann Jacob Reichard (1743–1782)
 Reichardt – Heinrich Wilhelm Reichardt (1835–1885)
 Reiche – Karl Friedrich Reiche (1860–1929)
 Reichert – Israel G. Reichert (1889–1975)
 Reichst. – Tadeus Reichstein (1897–1996)
 Reinh. – Otto Wilhelm Hermann Reinhardt (1838–1924) 
 Reinke – Johannes Reinke (1849–1931)
 Reinsch – Paul Friedrich Reinsch (1836–1914)
 Reinw. – Caspar Georg Carl Reinwardt (1773–1854)
 Reiss – Frederick Reiss (fl. 1968)
 Reissek – Siegfried Reisseck (1819–1871)
 R.E.Kunze – Richard Ernest Kunze (1838–1919)
 R.E.Lee – Robert Edwin Lee (born 1911)
 R.Emers. – Ralph Emerson (1912–1979)
 Renault – Bernard Renault (1836–1904)
 Rendle – Alfred Barton Rendle (1865–1938)
 Renvoize – Stephen Andrew Renvoize (born 1944)
 Renz – Jany Renz (1907–1999)
 Req. – Esprit Requien (1788–1851)
 R.E.Schult. – Richard Evans Schultes (1915–2001)
 R.Escobar – Rodrigo Escobar (1935–2009)
 Resv.-Holms. – Hanna Resvoll-Holmsen (1873–1943)
 Resvoll – Thekla Resvoll (1871–1948)
 Retz. – Anders Johan Retzius (1742–1821)
 Reut. – George François Reuter (1805–1872)
 R.E.Vaughan – Reginald Edward Vaughan (1875–1987)
 Reveal – James Lauritz Reveal (1941–2015)
 Reyneke – William Frederick Reyneke (born 1945)
 Reynel – Carlos Reynel Reynel (fl. 1995)
 Reznicek – Anton Albert Reznicek (born 1950)
 R.Fern. – Rosette Batarda Fernandes (1916–2005)
 R.F.Martin – Robert Franklin Martin (born 1910)
 R.G.Garcia – Ricardo G. García
 R.H.Anderson – Robert Henry Anderson (1899–1969)
 R.H.Archer – Robert H. Archer (born 1965)
 R.Harkn. – Robert Harkness (1816–1878)
 R.Hartig – Heinrich Julius Adolph Robert Hartig (1839–1901)
 R.Hedw. – Romanus Adolf Hedwig (1772–1806)
 Rheede – Hendrik Adriaan van Rheede tot Drakenstein (1636–1691)
 R.H.Miao – Ru Huai Miao (born 1943)
 Rhode – Johann Gottlieb Rhode (1762–1827)
 R.Hoffm. – Reinhold Hoffmann (born 1885)
 R.Hogg – Robert Hogg (1818–1897)
 R.H.Petersen – Ronald H. Petersen (born 1934)
 R.H.Roberts – Richard Henry Roberts (1910–2003)
 R.H.Schomb. – Robert Hermann Schomburgk (1804–1865)
 R.H.Wallace – R. H. Wallace (fl. 1955)
 Riccob. – Vincenzo Riccobono (1861–1943)
 Rich. – Louis Claude Marie Richard (1754–1821)
 Richardson – John Richardson (1787–1865)
 Richens – Richard Hook Richens (1919–1984)
 Richerson – Peter James Richerson (born 1943)
 Ricken – Adalbert Ricken (1851–1921)
 Ricker – Percy Leroy Ricker (1878–1973)
 Ricketson – Jon M. Ricketson (fl. 1997)
 Riddell – John Leonard Riddell (1807–1865)
 Ridl. – Henry Nicholas Ridley (1855–1956)
 Ridsdale – Colin Ernest Ridsdale (born 1944)
 Riedel – Ludwig Riedel (1790–1861)
 Rieder – Conly Leroy Rieder (born 1950)
 Riedl – Harald Udo von Riedl (born 1936)
 Rigg – George Burton Rigg (1872–1961)
 Rigoni – Victor A. Rigoni (fl. 1958)
 Říha – Jan Říha (born 1947)
 Rink – Hinrich (Henrik) Johannes Rink (1819–1893)
 Riocreux – Alfred Riocreux (1820–1912)
 Risso – Antoine Risso (1777–1845)
 Ritgen – Ferdinand August Maria Franz von Ritgen  (1787–1867)
 Riv. – Augustus Quirinus Rivinus (also as August Bachmann) (1652–1723)
 Rivadavia – Fernando Rivadavia (fl. 2003)
 Rivière – Marie Auguste Rivière (1821–1877)
 Rix – Edward Martyn Rix (born 1943)
 Rizzini – Carlos Toledo Rizzini (born 1921)
 R.J.Bates – Robert John Bates (born 1946)
 R.J.Bayer – Randall James Bayer (born 1955)
 R.J.Carp. – Raymond J. Carpenter (fl. 2008)
 R.J.D.Graham – Robert James Douglas Graham (1884–1950)
 R.J.Eaton – Richard Jefferson Eaton (1890–1976)
 R.J.F.Hend. – Rodney John Francis Henderson (born 1938)
 R.J.McKenzie – Robert J. McKenzie (fl. 2006)
 R.J.Moore – Raymond John Moore (1918–1988)
 R.J.Roberts – Ronald John Roberts (born 1941)
 R.J.Scheff. – R. J. Scheffer (fl. 1984)
 R.Keller – Robert Keller (1854–1939)
 R.K.Godfrey – Robert Kenneth Godfrey (1911–2000)
 R.Kiesling – Roberto Kiesling (born 1941)
 R.King – Robert King (fl. 1879)
 R.K.Jansen – Robert K. Jansen (born 1954)
 R.Klebs – Richard Klebs (1850–1911)
 R.Knuth – Reinhard Gustav Paul Knuth (1874–1957)
 R.K.S.Lee – Robert Kui Sung Lee (born 1931)
 R.L.Barrett – Russell Lindsay Barrett (born 1977)
 R.Lesson – René Primevère Lesson (1794–1849)
 R.L.Giles – Robyn L. Giles (fl. 2008)
 R.Mason – Ruth Mason (1913–1990)
 R.M.Barker – Robyn Mary Barker (born 1948)
 R.M.Beauch. – R. Mitchel Beauchamp (fl. 1974)
 R.M.Fonseca – Rosa María Fonseca (fl. 2005)
 R.M.Fritsch – Reinhard M. Fritsch (fl. 1992)
 R.M.Harper – Roland McMillan Harper (1878–1966)
 R.M.Johnst. – Robert Mackenzie Johnston (1844–1918)
 R.M.King – Robert Merrill King (born 1930)
 R.M.K.Saunders – Richard M.K. Saunders (born 1964)
 R.Morales – Ramón Morales Valverde (born 1950)
 R.Morgan – Robert Morgan (1863–1900)
 R.M.Patrick – Ruth Patrick (1907–2013)
 R.M.Schust. – Rudolf M. Schuster (born 1921)
 R.M.Sm. – Rosemary Margaret Smith (1933–2004) 
 R.M.Tryon – Rolla Milton Tryon, Jr. (1916–2001)
 R.N.R.Br. – Robert Neal Rudmose-Brown (1879–1957)
 Rob. – William Robinson (1838–1935)
 Robatsch – Karl Robatsch (1929–2001)
 Robbertse – Petrus Johannes Robbertse (born 1932)
 Robbr. – Elmar Robbrecht (born 1946)
 Roberg – Lars Roberg (1664–1742)
 Robert – Gaspard Nicolas Robert (1776–1857)
 Robertson – David Robertson (1806–1896)
 Roberty – Guy Edouard Roberty (1907–1971)
 Robyns – Frans Hubert Edouard Arthur Walter Robyns (1901–1986)
 Rochebr. – Alphonse Trémeau de Rochebrune (1834–1912)
 Rochel – Anton Rochel (1770–1847)
 Rock – Joseph Rock (1884–1962)
 Rockley – Alicia Margaret Amherst Cecil Rockley (1865–1941)
 R.O.Cunn. – Robert Oliver Cunningham (1841–1918)
 Rodd – Anthony N. Rodd (born 1940)
 Rodin – Hippolyte Rodin (1829–1886)
 Rodion. – Georgi Ivanovich Rodionenko (born 1913)
 Rodr. – José Demetrio Rodrígues (1780–1846)
 Rodrigo – América del Pilar Rodrigo (fl. 1938–1941)
 Rodway – Leonard Rodway (1853–1936)
 Roem. – Johann Jacob Roemer (1763–1819)
 Roezl – Benedikt Roezl (1823–1885)
 Roffavier – Georges Roffavier (1775–1866)
 Rogerson – Clark Thomas Rogerson (1918–2001)
 Rogow. – Athanasi Semenovich Rogowicz (1812–1878)
 Rohde – Michael Rohde (1782–1812)
 Röhl. – Johann Christoph Röhling (1757–1813)
 Rohr – Julius Philip Benjamin von Rohr (1737–1793)
 Rohrb. – Paul Rohrbach (1846–1871)
 Rohwer – Jens Gunter Rohwer (born 1958)
 Roiv. – Heikki Roivainen (1900–1983)
 Rojas – Teodoro Rojas (1877–1954)
 Rojas Acosta – Nicolás Rojas Acosta (1873–1946)
 Rolfe – Robert Allen Rolfe (1855–1921)
 Rolland – Léon Louis Rolland (1841–1912)
 Rollins – Reed Clark Rollins (1911–1998)
 Romagn. – Henri Romagnesi (1912–1999)
 Romans – Bernard Romans (c. 1720–1784)
 Rondelet – Guillaume Rondelet (1507–1566)
 Rooke – Hayman Rooke (1723–1806)
 Roque – Nádia Roque (fl. 1997)
 Rosatti – Thomas James Rosatti (born 1951)
 Rose – Joseph Nelson Rose (1862–1928)
 Rosell. – Ferdinando Rosellini (1817–1873)
 Rosend. – Carl Otto Rosendahl (1875–1956)
 Roseng. – Bernardo Rosengurtt (1916–1985)
 Rosenstein (also N.Rosén) – Nils Rosén von Rosenstein (1706–1773)
 Rosentr. – Roger Rosentreter (born 1951) 
 Rosenv. – Janus Lauritz Andreas Kolderup Rosenvinge (1858–1939)
 Roshev. – Roman Julievich Roshevitz (1882–1949)
 Ross – John Ross (1777–1856)
 Rossi – Pietro Rossi (1738–1804)
 Rossm. – Emil Adolf (Adolph) Rossmässler (1806–1867)
 Rostaf. – Józef Thomasz Rostafiński (1850–1928)
 Rostk. – Friedrich Wilhelm Gottlieb Theophil Rostkovius (1770–1848)
 Rostr. – Frederik Georg Emil Rostrup (1831–1907)
 Rota – Lorenzo Rota (1819–1855)
 Roth – Albrecht Wilhelm Roth (1757–1834)
 Rothm. – Werner Hugo Paul Rothmaler (1908–1962)
 Rothman – Göran Rothman (1739–1778)
 Rothr. – Joseph Trimble Rothrock (1839–1922)
 Rothsch. – Jules Rothschild (born 1838)
 Rot Schreck. – Friedrich Rot von Schreckenstein (1753–1808)
 Rottb. – Christen Friis Rottbøll (1727–1797)
 Rottler – Johan Peter Rottler (1749–1836)
 Roubaud – Émile Roubaud (1882–1962)
 Roupell – Arabella Elizabeth Roupell (1817–1914)
 Rourke – John Patrick Rourke (born 1942)
 Roush – Eva Myrtelle Roush (1886–1954)
 Rousseau – Jean-Jacques Rousseau (1712–1778)
 Roussel – Henri François Anne de Roussel (1747–1812)
 Roux – Jacques Roux (1773–1822)
 Rouy – Georges Rouy (1851–1924)
 Rowland – Verner Hawsbrook Rowland (born 1883)
 Rowntree – Lester Gertrude Ellen Rowntree (1879–1979)
 Roxb. – William Roxburgh (1751–1815)
 Royen – Adriaan van Royen (1704–1779)
 Royle – John Forbes Royle (1798–1858)
 Roy L.Taylor – Roy Lewis Taylor (1932–2013)
 Rozanova – Maria Aleksandrovna Rozanova (Maria Alexandrovna Rozanova) (1885–1957)
 Rozefelds – Andrew Carl Frank Rozefelds (born 1960)
 Rozier – François Rozier (Jean-François) (1734–1793)
 R.Parker – Richard Neville Parker (1884–1958)
 R.Patt. – Robert Patterson (born 1947)
 R.P.Ellis – Roger Pearson Ellis (born 1944)
 R.P.Murray – Richard Paget Murray (1842–1908)
 R.Pott – Reino Pott (1869–1965)
 R.P.White – Richard Peregrine White (born 1896)
 R.Rabev. – Raymond Rabevohitra (born 1946)
 R.R.Bloxam – Richard Rowland Bloxam (1798–1877)
 R.R.Haynes – Robert Ralph Haynes (born 1945)
 R.Rice – Rod Rice (born 1963)
 R.Ross – Robert Ross (1912–2005)
 R.R.Rao – R.Raghavendra Rao (born 1945)
 R.R.Scott – Robert Robinson Scott (1827–1877)
 R.R.Stewart – Ralph Randles Stewart (1890–1993)
 R.S.Almeida – Rafael S. Almeida (fl. 1998)
 R.Schultz – Richard Schultz (1858–1936)
 R.S.Cowan – Richard Sumner Cowan (1921–1997)
 R.S.Hill – Robert Southey Hill (born 1954)
 R.S.Irving – Robert Stewart Irving (born 1942)
 R.S.Rogers – Richard Sanders Rogers (1861–1942)
 R.S.Wallace – Robert S. Wallace (fl. 1997)
 R.S.Williams – Robert Statham Williams (1859–1945)
 R.T.Baker – Richard Thomas Baker (1854–1941)
 R.T.Clausen – Robert Theodore Clausen (1911–1981)
 R.T.Mill. – R. T. Miller (fl. 2012)
 R.T.Veitch – Robert Veitch (1823–1885)
 Rudall – Paula J. Rudall (born 1954)
 Rudd – Velva Elaine Rudd (1910–1999)
 Rudge – Edward Rudge (1763–1846)
 Rudolph – Johann Heinrich Rudolph (1744–1809)
 Rudolphi – Karl Rudolphi (1771–1832)
 R.Uechtr. – Rudolf Friedrich von Uechtritz (1838–1886)
 Ruhland – Wilhelm Otto Eugen Ruhland (1878–1960)
 Ruiz – Hipólito Ruiz López (1754–1815)
 Rule – Kevin James Rule (born 1941)
 Rumph. – Georg Eberhard Rumphius (1628–1702)
 Rümpler – Karl Theodor Rümpler (1817–1891)
 Rundel – Philip Wilson Rundel (born 1943)
 Rupp – Herman Rupp (1872–1956) 
 Ruppius – Heinrich Bernard Ruppius (1688–1719)
 Rupr. – Franz Josef Ruprecht (1814–1870)
 Rusby – Henry Hurd Rusby (1855–1940)
 Russow – Edmund August Friedrich Russow (1841–1897)
 Rustan – Ovind H. Rustan (born 1954)
 Rutenb. – Diedrich Christian Rutenberg (1851–1878)
 Rutherf. – Daniel Rutherford (1749–1819)
 Rutk. – Piotr Rutkowski (born 1969)
 Ruysch – Frederik Ruysch (1638–1731)
 R.Vásquez – Roberto Vásquez (born 1941)
 R.Vig. – René Viguier (1880–1931)
 R.V.Sm. – Raymond Vaughan Smith (born 1923)
 R.Wagner – Rudolf Wagner (born 1872)
 R.Wallis – Rannveig Wallis (fl. 2002)
 R.Warner – Robert Warner (c. 1815–1896)
 R.W.Br. – Roland Wilbur Brown (1893–1961)
 R.W.Darwin – Robert Waring Darwin of Elston (1724–1816)
 R.W.Davis – Robert Wayne Davis (born 1959)
 R.W.Jobson – Richard W. Jobson (fl. 2007)
 R.W.Long – Robert William Long (1927–1976)
 R.W.Pohl – Richard Walter Pohl (1916–1993)
 R.W.Wallace – Robert Whistler Wallace (1867–1955)
 Rycroft – Hedley Brian Rycroft (1918–1990)
 Rydb. – Per Axel Rydberg (1860–1931)
 Rye – Barbara Lynette Rye (born 1952)
 R.Yonzone – Rajendra Yonzone (fl. 2012)
 Ryppowa – Halina w Kowalskich Ryppowa (1899–1927)
 Rzed. – Jerzy Rzedowski (born 1926)

S–Z 

To find entries for S–Z, use the table of contents above.

 
1